Bossington may refer to:
 Bossington, Hampshire
 Bossington, Kent
 Bossington, Somerset